The Broken Jug Formation is a geologic formation in southwestern New Mexico. It was likely deposited in the late Jurassic period.

Description
The formation consists of a variety of marine, deltaic, and volcanic rocks. It is divided into five informal members. This rests disconformably on Paleozoic limestone, either the Escabrosa Limestone or the Horquilla Limestone. The third member is the fine-grained member, consisting of  varied sandstone, siltstone, and mudstone. A number of diabase dikes and sills intrude the lower part of this member.

The formation is thought to have been deposited in a subsiding marine basin (Bisbee basin), which was subsequently filled in by delta deposits and capped by subaerial silica-poor (mafic) lava flows. The formation is late Jurassic in age, based on fossils in the upper conglomerate member, the position of the formation in the stratigraphic column, and its similarity to nearby formations whose age is better constrained.

Fossils
The lower conglomerate member contains abundant limestone fragments (clasts) that are fossiliferous and suggest the clasts came from Carboniferous to Permian beds. A fossil of Omphalotrochus in one such clast is characteristic of the early Permian. The fine-grained member is sparsely fossiliferous, containing shell fragments and forams that have been recrystallized to coarse-grained calcite. Age-diagnostic fossils are present near the base of the upper conglomerate member, including the bivalve mollusc Gryphaea mexicana,  gastropods (Nerineidae) and the coral Thamnasteria.

History of investigation
The formation was first defined by S.G. Lasky in 1938 for exposures at Broken Jug Pass in the Little Hatchet Mountains of New Mexico. R.A. Zeller, Jr., assigned these beds to the Hell-to-Finish Formation or Mojado Formation in 1970, but the formation was redefined by T.F. Lawton in 1998 and continues in use.

See also

 List of fossiliferous stratigraphic units in New Mexico
 Paleontology in New Mexico

References

Jurassic formations of New Mexico